The Nile Delta (or simply) is the delta formed in Lower Egypt where the Nile River spreads out and drains into the Mediterranean Sea. The Delta begins slightly down-river from Cairo.

Geography

The delta is sometimes divided into sections, with the Nile dividing into two main distributaries, the Damietta and the Rosetta, flowing into the Mediterranean at port cities with the same name. In the past, the delta had several distributaries, but these have been lost due to flood control, silting and changing relief. One such defunct distributary is Wadi Tumilat.

The Suez Canal is east of the delta and enters the coastal Lake Manzala in the north-east of the delta. To the north-west are three other coastal lakes or lagoons: Lake Burullus, Lake Idku and Lake Mariout.

The Nile is considered to be an "arcuate" delta (arc-shaped), as it resembles a triangle or flower when seen from above. Some scholars such as Aristotle have written that the delta was constructed for agricultural purposes due to the drying of the region of Egypt.

In modern day, the outer edges of the delta are eroding, and some coastal lagoons have seen increasing salinity levels as their connection to the Mediterranean Sea increases. Since the delta no longer receives an annual supply of nutrients and sediments from upstream due to the construction of the Aswan Dam, the soils of the floodplains have become poorer, and large amounts of fertilizers are now used.

History

People have lived in the Nile Delta region for thousands of years, and it has been intensively farmed for at least the last five thousand years. The delta was a major constituent of Lower Egypt, and there are many archaeological sites in and around the delta. Artifacts belonging to ancient sites have been found on the delta's coast. The Rosetta Stone was found in the delta in 1799 in the port city of Rosetta (an anglicized version of the name Rashid).  In July 2019 a small Greek temple, ancient granite columns, treasure-carrying ships, and bronze coins from the reign of Ptolemy II, dating back to the third and fourth centuries BC, were found at the sunken city of Heracleion, colloquially known as Egypt's Atlantis. The investigations were conducted by Egyptian and European divers led by the underwater archaeologist Franck Goddio. They also uncovered a devastated historic temple (the city's main temple) underwater off Egypt's north coast.

In January 2019 archaeologists led by Mostafa Waziri working in the Kom Al-Khelgan area of the Nile Delta discovered tombs from the Second Intermediate Period and burials from the Naqada II era. The burial site contained the remains of animals, amulets and scarabs carved from faience, round and oval pots with handles, flint knives, broken and burned pottery. All burials included skulls and skeletons in the bending position and were not very well-preserved.

Ancient branches of the Nile

Records from ancient times (such as by Ptolemy) show that the delta had seven distributaries or branches, (from east to west): 
the Pelusiac,
the Tanitic,
the Mendesian,
the Phatnitic (or Phatmetic),
the Sebennytic,
the Bolbitine, and
the Canopic (also called the Herakleotic and the Agathodaemon)

There are now only two main branches, due to flood control, silting and changing relief: the Damietta (corresponding to the Phatnitic) to the east, and the Rosetta (corresponding to the Bolbitine) in the western part of the Delta.   The Delta used to flood annually, but this ended with the construction of the Aswan Dam.

Population

About 39 million people live in the Delta region. Outside of major cities, population density in the delta averages  or more. Alexandria is the largest city in the delta with an estimated population of more than 4.5 million. Other large cities in the delta include Shubra El Kheima, Port Said, El Mahalla El Kubra, Mansura, Tanta, and Zagazig.

Wildlife

During autumn, parts of the Nile River are red with lotus flowers. The Lower Nile (North) and the Upper Nile (South) have plants that grow in abundance. The Upper Nile plant is the Egyptian lotus, and the Lower Nile plant is the Papyrus Sedge (Cyperus papyrus), although it is not nearly as plentiful as it once was, and is becoming quite rare.

Several hundred thousand water birds winter in the delta, including the world's largest concentrations of little gulls and whiskered terns. Other birds making their homes in the delta include grey herons, Kentish plovers, shovelers, cormorants, egrets and ibises.

Other animals found in the delta include frogs, turtles, tortoises, mongooses, and the Nile monitor. Nile crocodiles and hippopotamus, two animals which were widespread in the delta during antiquity, are no longer found there. Fish found in the delta include the flathead grey mullet and soles.

Climate

The Delta has a hot desert climate (Köppen: BWh) as the rest of Egypt, but its northernmost part, as is the case with the rest of the northern coast of Egypt which is the wettest region in the country, has relatively moderate temperatures, with highs usually not surpassing  in the summer. Only  of rain falls on the delta area during an average year, and most of this falls in the winter months. With cooler temperatures and some rain, the Nile Delta region becomes quite humid during the winter months.

Sea level rise

Egypt's Mediterranean coastline experiences significant loss of land to the sea, in some places amounting to  a year. The low-lying Nile Delta area in particular is vulnerable to sea level rise associated with global warming. This effect is exacerbated by the lack of sediments being deposited since the construction of the Aswan Dam. If the polar ice caps were to melt, much of the northern delta, including the ancient port city of Alexandria, could disappear under the Mediterranean. A  rise in sea level could affect about 6.6% of the total land cover area in the Nile Delta region. Some areas of the Nile Delta's agricultural land have been rendered saline as a result of sea level rise; farming has been abandoned in some places, while in others sand has been brought in from elsewhere to reduce the effect. In addition to agriculture, the delta's ecosystems and tourist industry could be negatively affected by global warming. Food shortages resulting from climate change could lead to seven million "climate refugees" by the end of the 21st century. Nevertheless, environmental damage to the delta is not currently one of Egypt's priorities.

The delta's coastline has also undergone significant changes in geomorphology as a result of the reclamation of coastal dunes and lagoons to form new agricultural land and fish farms as well as the expansion of coastal urban areas.

Governorates and large cities
The Nile Delta forms part of these 10 governorates:

Alexandria
Beheira
Kafr el Sheikh
Gharbiya
Minufiya
Qalyubiya
Dakahlia
Damietta
Sharqiyah
Port Said

Large cities located in the Nile Delta:

Abusir
Alexandria
Avaris
Bilbeis
Bubastis
Canopus
Damanhur
Desouk
Damietta
El Mahalla El Kubra
Kafr El Sheikh
Leontopolis
Mendes
Mit Abu El Kom
Mansoura
Naucratis
Pelusium
Port Said
Rosetta
Sais
Tanis
Tanta
Zagazig

References

External links

Adaptationlearning.net: UN project for managing sea level rise risks in the Nile Delta

 
Delta
River deltas of Africa
Landforms of Egypt
Landforms of the Mediterranean
Flooded grasslands and savannas
Freshwater ecoregions of Africa
Ecoregions of Egypt
Eastern Mediterranean